Elizabeth Jean "Busy" Philipps (born June 25, 1979) is an American actress. She is best known for her roles on the television series Freaks and Geeks (1999–2000), Dawson's Creek (2001–2003), Love, Inc. (2005–2006) and ER (2006–2007), for her abortion access advocacy, and for her portrayal of Laurie Keller on the ABC series Cougar Town (2009–2015), for which she received the Critics' Choice Television Award for Best Supporting Actress in a Comedy Series. She has also appeared in supporting roles in numerous films, such as The Smokers (2000), Home Room (2002), White Chicks (2004), Made of Honor (2008), He's Just Not That Into You (2009), The Gift (2015), and I Feel Pretty (2018). From 2018 to 2019, Philipps hosted her own television talk show Busy Tonight, on E!. She currently stars in the Peacock original series Girls5eva.

Childhood
Philipps was born in Oak Park, Illinois, a suburb of Chicago. She received the nickname "Busy" as a child; sources conflict on whether the nickname came from her parents or a babysitter named Susie. She said on her late-night talk show, Busy Tonight, that her mother gave her the nickname, but during her book tour said that her babysitter had given it to her. This was clarified on an episode of Comedy Bang! Bang! when she confirmed to host Scott Aukerman that it was her babysitter, in his quest to achieve Wikipedia clout.

Phillips attended Loyola Marymount University at the same time as Freaks and Geeks costars Linda Cardellini and Colin Hanks. She then dated Hanks for several years, after they left school.

Career

While still in high school, Philipps worked at toy trade fairs as a real-life Barbie, her sister "Cool Teen Skipper™️”. Among the many people who saw her at toy conventions was actress Sharon Stone, who was impressed with her performance and told Philipps that she would be a star.

Her first major role was Kim Kelly in the 1999–2000 comedy-drama TV series Freaks and Geeks; Philipps appeared in all but one of the show's 18 episodes (the episode "Chokin' & Tokin'"). She made her film debut in the comedy The Smokers in 2000, and had various small appearances on television.

In 2001, Philipps was cast as Audrey Liddell in the teen drama Dawson's Creek. She was a series regular in seasons 5 and 6, appearing in 46 episodes, before the show finished in 2003. The role earned her a Teen Choice Awards nomination in the category of "TV - Choice Sidekick".

Philipps appeared in several films, including Home Room (2002) and White Chicks (2004). She was cast in the UPN sitcom Love, Inc. in a role originally intended for Shannen Doherty. The show lasted one season (2005–2006). In 2006, she had a major recurring role as Hope Bobeck on ER, alongside her Freaks and Geeks co-star Linda Cardellini. During her second year on ER, her character was written out as heading to South America to "fulfill her Christian mission".

Philipps had a co-credit for the storyline of the 2007 comedy film Blades of Glory. A year later, she appeared in a supporting role in Made of Honor.

She made appearances in He's Just Not That Into You as Kelli Ann and on an episode of How I Met Your Mother.

From 2009 to 2015, Philipps portrayed Laurie Keller in the television series Cougar Town. She routinely contributed to the Thrilling Adventure Hour, a live stage radio show. Her primary recurring character was the Red Plains Rider.

On a 2010 appearance on Chelsea Lately, Philipps said that she auditioned for the hit television show Glee just one week after giving birth, following a pregnancy during which she gained 80 pounds.

Philipps starred on the HBO series Vice Principals (2016–2017).

In 2017, she signed on as co-lead opposite Casey Wilson in Tina Fey's comedy pilot The Sackett Sisters for NBC, but it was not picked up.

In 2018 and 2019, Philipps played Sheba Goodman in season 4 of Netflix’s Unbreakable Kimmy Schmidt.

She had a late-night talk show called Busy Tonight, which aired on E! from October 28, 2018, to May 16, 2019. It was cancelled the same day Philipps was nominated for a 2019 Critics Choice Award. In August 2020 she began hosting a podcast, Busy Philipps is Doing Her Best, along with former Busy Tonight writers Caissie St. Onge and Shantira Jackson.

In February 28, 2023, Philipps was announced as Mrs. George in the upcoming film adaptation of the musical Mean Girls, based on the 2018 Broadway musical, which in turn is based on the 2004 film of the same name.

Book
Philipps's memoir, This Will Only Hurt a Little, was released October 18, 2018. It includes a passage where she describes a physical altercation she had with James Franco on the set of Freaks and Geeks. She said she was "bummed" by the amount of attention drawn to just this incident in the book, saying the story was not new, and that she meant it "to illustrate a larger point about the way women are treated in this business and in life."

Political views
After the Alabama Legislature's May 14, 2019, passage of House Bill 314 (also known as the "Human Life Protection Act"), Philipps advocated that women speak out if they had had abortions. On May 14, she invoked the hashtag, #YouKnowMe (established on February 18) to her 370,000 followers on Twitter, with her call for testimonies:
1 in 4 women have had an abortion. Many people think they don't know someone who has, but #youknowme. So let's do this: if you are also the 1 in 4, let's share it and start to end the shame. Use #youknowme and share your truth.

The previous week she revealed on her Busy Tonight TV show that she had an abortion at age 15.

On June 4, 2019, Philipps gave a testimonial before the House Judiciary Committee defending women's right to access more abortion clinics. She spoke of her own experience with abortion: I am a human being that deserves autonomy in this country that calls itself free, and choices that a human being makes about their own bodies should not be legislated by strangers who can’t possibly know or understand each individual’s circumstances or beliefs.

Personal life
Philipps married screenwriter Marc Silverstein on June 16, 2007. They have two children: Birdie Leigh, born in 2008, and Cricket Pearl, born in 2013. They separated in February 2021.

Filmography

Film

Television

Awards and nominations

References

External links

 
 
 PopGurls Interview: Busy Philipps

1979 births
20th-century American actresses
21st-century American actresses
Actors from Oak Park, Illinois
Actresses from Illinois
American film actresses
American memoirists
American podcasters
American television actresses
American women memoirists
American women podcasters
Late night television talk show hosts
Living people
Loyola Marymount University alumni